Walter Saldanha (born October 31, 1931) co-founder with Brendan Pereira, of Chaitra Advertising Private
Limited, now Leo Burnett India. Currently the Chairman-Cum-Managing Director of Chaitra Holdings Private Limited. In 2001, he founded the Asian Institute of Communication and Research, better known as AICAR Business School.

Career
He started his career as a typist in 1947, a few months short of his 16th birthday. In 1951 he joined the advertising agency J Walter Thompson (JWT India) as secretary to a senior account executive. He worked with JWT in various roles, he was also instrumental in setting up JWT operations in Sri Lanka. In 1972, he and Creative Director Brendan Pereira, left Aiyar Advertising and Marketing Ltd, to set up their own advertising agency, Chaitra Advertising. By 1983 Chaitra Advertising was among the top 10 advertising agencies in India. In the late 90s Chaitra Advertising was acquired by Leo Burnett, one of the leading advertising agencies in the world. In 2001 he set up the Asian Institute of Communication & Research, better known as AICAR Business School. He is also a member of the Board of Directors for Aptech Limited.

Mr. Saldanha is also the Hon. Treasurer of the Society for Eradication of Leprosy, he is also a Trustee of the Sangeet Abhinay Academy, an organization devoted to the development of musical talent and the Shanti Avedna Sadan (a home for terminally ill cancer patients). He is a former Chairman of Slum Rehabilitation Society.

Awards
In 2000, Mr. Saldanha was awarded for his outstanding contribution to advertising by the Advertising Agencies Association of India (AAAI).

References

External links
Aptech Walter Saldanha
Interview: Walter Saldanha
Walter Saldanha sets up AICAR Business School

1931 births
Living people
Indian advertising executives
Founders of Indian schools and colleges